The First International Topological Conference was held in Moscow, 4–10 September, 1935. With presentations by topologists from 10 different countries it constituted the first genuinely international meeting devoted to topology in the world history of the mathematical community. Although a previous mathematical conference had been held in Kharkiv, and attended by Jacques Hadamard, this turned out to be the only truly international conference organised under the Stalin regime. Pavel Aleksandrov played a key role in organising the conference. The foreign delegates were accommodated in major hotels across Moscow, although according to André Weil, the principal form of sustenance was Caviar Canapes served in the conference hall, as no food was available in the hotel restaurants.

Presentations
Documentation of the conference varies, but this summary was drawn from various sources.

Homology Theory
 Karol Borsuk: ‘‘On spheroidal spaces’’
 Eduard Čech: "Accessibility and Homology'"
 Israel Isaakovich Gordon: ‘‘On the intersection invariants of a complex and its residual space.’
 Solomon Lefschetz: ‘‘On locally connected sets.’’

Attendees
The following topologists made presentations:

Czechoslovakia:
 Eduard Čech

France:
 André Weil

Netherlands
 Hans Freudenthal
 Egbert van Kampen

Poland:
 Karol Borsuk
 Kazimierz Kuratowski
 Juliusz Schauder
 Kazimierz Zarankiewicz

USA:
 James Waddell Alexander II
 Garrett Birkhoff
 Solomon Lefschetz
 John  von  Neumann
 Albert W. Tucker
 Hassler Whitney

USSR:
 Pavel Aleksandrov
 Felix Frankl
 Israel Isaakovich Gordon
 Maria A. Nikolaenko
 Julia Rozanska
 Lev Pontryagin
 Vyacheslav Stepanov
 Lev Tumarkin

References

1935 in the Soviet Union
Topology